Gerardo Clemente (born 2 October 1984, in Grabs) is a Swiss football player who currently plays for USV Eschen/Mauren.

Career
Clemente began his career in the youth side for FC St. Gallen and joined 2000 alongside teammember Davide Chiumento to the Primavera team from Juventus F.C. He previously played for FC Lucerne in the Swiss Super League.

Personal life
Gerardo is of Italian descent and his brother Francesco plays with him by USV Eschen/Mauren in Liechtenstein.

References

1984 births
Living people
Swiss men's footballers
Swiss people of Spanish descent
Sportspeople from the canton of St. Gallen
Swiss expatriates in Liechtenstein
Juventus F.C. players
U.S. Massese 1919 players
Expatriate footballers in Liechtenstein
FC Luzern players
Swiss Super League players
Expatriate footballers in Italy
Association football midfielders
Swiss expatriate sportspeople in Italy
USV Eschen/Mauren players